Doveridge is a civil parish in the Derbyshire Dales district of Derbyshire, England.  The parish contains 24 listed buildings that are recorded in the National Heritage List for England.  Of these, one is listed at Grade I, the highest of the three grades, three are at Grade II*, the middle grade, and the others are at Grade II, the lowest grade.  The parish contains the village of Doveridge and the surrounding countryside.  Apart from a church, a cross in the churchyard, and a public house, all the listed buildings are houses, cottages and associated structures, farmhouses and farm buildings.


Key

Buildings

References

Citations

Sources

 

Lists of listed buildings in Derbyshire